The 2023 season is Polis Di-Raja Malaysia Football Club's's 33rd season in the football club's history and 1st season in the top flight of Malaysian football, Malaysia Super League since promoted last season. The club also will participate in this season's edition of the Malaysia FA Cup and the Malaysia Cup.

Coaching staff

 Head coach: Azzmi Aziz
 Assistant head coach: Eddy Gapil@Edwin
 Assistant coach:Al Madi Jumari
 Goalkeeper coach: Atfan Had
 Fitness coach: Nizan Ariffin

Players

First-team squad

Transfers in

Transfers out

Competitions

Malaysia Super League

Malaysia FA Cup

Statistics

Appearances and goals

|-
! colspan="16" style="background:#dcdcdc; text-align:center"| Goalkeepers

|-
! colspan="16" style="background:#dcdcdc; text-align:center"| Defenders

|-
! colspan="16" style="background:#dcdcdc; text-align:center"| Midfielders

|-
! colspan="16" style="background:#dcdcdc; text-align:center"| Forwards

|-
! colspan="16" style="background:#dcdcdc; text-align:center"| Players transferred out during the season
|-

References

PDRM
PDRM FA